Benjamin Komla Kpodo is a Ghanaian politician and member of the Seventh Parliament of the Fourth Republic of Ghana representing the Ho Central Constituency in the Volta Region on the ticket of the National Democratic Congress.

Early life and education 
Kpodo was born on December 22, 1953. He hails from Tanyigbe, a town in the Volta Region of Ghana. He obtained his bachelor's degree in Administration-Accounting option from the University of Ghana in 1980. He obtained his master's of science in Accounting from the University of Lagos in 1991.

Politics
Kpodo is a member of the National Democratic Congress (NDC). In 2012, he contested for the Ho Central seat on the ticket of the NDC sixth parliament of the fourth republic and won. He retained his seat in the 2016 Ghanaian general election, winning 79.5% of the votes. In the 2020 election, he won 85% of the votes to again retain his seat.

Employment 
 Finance Officer, University of Education, Winneba
 Member of Parliament (January 7, 2013 – present; 2nd term)

Personal life 
He is a Christian (Evangelical Presbyterian). He is married, with seven children.

References

1953 births
Living people
National Democratic Congress (Ghana) politicians
Ghanaian MPs 2013–2017
Ghanaian MPs 2017–2021
University of Ghana alumni
University of Lagos alumni
Ghanaian MPs 2021–2025